Héctor Enrique Sánchez (born November 17, 1989) is a Venezuelan professional baseball catcher for the Milwaukee Milkmen of the American Association of Professional Baseball. He has played in Major League Baseball for the San Francisco Giants, Chicago White Sox, and San Diego Padres.

Career

San Francisco Giants
In 2011, after hitting .302 with 11 home runs and 58 RBI in 52 games for the San Jose Giants, Sánchez was promoted to the Fresno Grizzlies. Sánchez was called up to the majors for the first time on July 15, 2011.

He was selected to join the Giants' 2012 Opening Day roster as the backup catcher behind Buster Posey. Due to their pairing during Barry Zito's rehab stint at AAA in 2011, and their continued success together at the major-league level in 2012, he had been designated as Zito's personal catcher.  On April 23, 2012, Sánchez hit his first career home run off of Dillon Gee.  On May 6, 2012, Sánchez hit a pitch-hit, walk-off single against the Milwaukee Brewers despite a five-man infield.  On May 21, Sánchez hit his second career homer in the top of the 14th inning, against the Brewers again, to help the Giants win 4–3.  In 2012, Sánchez appeared in 74 games, batting .280 with 3 home runs and 34 RBI.  He was the backup catcher during the 2012 postseason, which culminated in the Giants winning the 2012 World Series.

In 2013, Sánchez played in 63 games, batting .248 with 3 home runs and 19 RBI.  On August 15, 2013, he hit a pinch-hit, 3-run home run off Washington Nationals closer Rafael Soriano with two outs in the top of the ninth inning.  The Giants were trailing 3–1 and held on to win 4–3.  On April 23, 2014, Sánchez hit his first career grand slam in the top of the 11th inning against the Colorado Rockies.  On June 25, 2014, Sánchez was the catcher for Tim Lincecum's second no-hitter against the San Diego Padres.  Sánchez went on the concussion list on July 26 and suffered a second concussion while on a rehab assignment and missed the rest of the 2014 season.

On July 21, 2015, Sánchez hit his second career grand slam off Dale Thayer of the San Diego Padres. In early September, Sánchez strained his left hamstring and sprained his left ankle running to first base and missed the rest of the season.  After the season, Sánchez was not tendered a contract by the Giants and became a free agent.

Chicago White Sox
On December 14, 2015, Sánchez signed a minor league deal with an invitation to spring training with the Chicago White Sox. The White Sox promoted Sánchez to the major leagues on April 26, 2016. He was designated for assignment on May 9.

San Diego Padres
After being designated by the White Sox, Sanchez was claimed by the San Diego Padres and added to the 25-man roster.  On June 14, he was designated for assignment and outrighted to the AAA El Paso Chihuahuas. For the season, he had the third-slowest baserunning sprint speed of all major league players, at 22.9 feet/second.

He was non-tendered in the 2016 offseason, and signed a minor league contract with the Padres on December 13, 2016. He elected free agency on November 6, 2017.

Return to San Francisco Giants
Sánchez returned to the Giants organization on a minor league contract on January 5, 2018. He was released from Triple AAA on May 27.

Detroit Tigers
On January 21, 2019, Sánchez signed a minor-league deal with the Detroit Tigers that included an invite to Spring Training. He was released on March 28, 2019.

Long Island Ducks
On April 8, 2019, Sánchez signed with the Long Island Ducks of the Atlantic League of Professional Baseball. He became a free agent following the season.

On November 30, 2020, Sánchez signed with the Ottawa Titans of the Frontier League. However, he did not appear in a game for the team before he was traded.

On April 17, 2021, Sánchez was traded to the Long Island Ducks of the Atlantic League of Professional Baseball in exchange for future considerations. In 82 games, Sánchez slashed .247/.324/.495 with 18 home runs and 70 RBIs.

Following the 2021 season, Sánchez was traded back to the Ottawa Titans of the Frontier League. On October 22, 2021, Sánchez was traded by the Titans to the Gateway Grizzlies of the Frontier League. However he would never play a game for the Grizzlies as he left them on January 24, 2022.

Cleburne Railroaders
On January 24, 2022, Sánchez signed with the Cleburne Railroaders of the American Association of Professional Baseball.

Milwaukee Milkmen
On August 16, 2022, Sanchez was traded to the Milwaukee Milkmen of the American Association of Professional Baseball.

See also
 List of Major League Baseball players from Venezuela

References

External links

1989 births
Living people
Arizona League Giants players
Augusta GreenJackets players
Charlotte Knights players
Chicago White Sox players
Dominican Summer League Giants players
Estrellas Orientales players
Venezuelan expatriate baseball players in the Dominican Republic
El Paso Chihuahuas players
Fresno Grizzlies players
Long Island Ducks players
Major League Baseball catchers
Major League Baseball players from Venezuela
Sportspeople from Maracay
San Diego Padres players
San Francisco Giants players
Sacramento River Cats players
San Jose Giants players
Tiburones de La Guaira players
American expatriate baseball players in Venezuela
Venezuelan expatriate baseball players in the United States